Deborah Coddington is a New Zealand journalist and former ACT New Zealand politician.

Pre-political career
Coddington, born in Waipukurau, worked from 1973 to 1984 as a magazine journalist, but in 1985 moved to Russell, a town in the Bay of Islands, where she owned and operated a café and restaurant. In 1989, she returned to journalism, writing for the Metro and North & South magazines. In 1993, she became a broadcaster, working for the BBC World Service's New Zealand operation. She then returned to magazines, becoming senior feature writer for North & South. In 2002, she won the Qantas Senior Feature Writer of the Year Award for her work.

From 1978 to 2004, her partner was the controversial publisher Alister Taylor, with whom she had three children.

Entry into politics
Coddington first became involved in politics in the context of the Libertarianz party, and in the 1996 election and the 1999 election, the Libertarianz ranked her second and third, respectively, on their party list.

Member of Parliament

Later, however, Coddington transferred her support to the ACT New Zealand party, which ranked her sixth on its party list in the 2002 election, high enough for her to enter Parliament as a list MP.

Many New Zealanders know her as the compiler of a register of sex-offenders which aims to publicly identify those convicted of sex-crimes. This register, first published in 1996, generated considerable criticism from those who alleged it breached the rights of criminals named in it. She has also published a registry of convicted child molesters in Australia. Coddington has also had a high amount of media interest in her personal life – early in 2004 journalists widely canvassed the financial problems of Alister Taylor, her partner (and her subsequent split from him), and later the same year, the media reported Coddington's distress about attention received from Roger Kerr, the executive director of the New Zealand Business Roundtable. Kerr allegedly chased her drunk, across the grounds of parliament. Coddington described the media's portrayal of events as "wildly overblown".

On 15 April 2005, Coddington announced that she would not seek re-election in 2005. In the announcement, she said that she did not regret entering politics, but said that she was no longer as eager to fight political battles. Coddington attributed her change in perspective primarily to her recent marriage to Wellington lawyer, Colin Carruthers QC.

Return to journalism
Coddington returned to journalism, writing for the Herald on Sunday and North & South. In 2019, Coddington was a judge for the Voyager Media Awards.

Controversy
In November 2006, Coddington published an article, "Asian Angst", in North & South magazine, questioning immigration and referencing the high profile of "Asian" crime, talking of a "gathering crime tide" and an "Asian menace". Coddington's article attempted to justify this language by pointing to a 53% increase in police arrest figures for "Asians" over the last 10 years. However she neglected to mention that the corresponding overall "Asian" population had increased by more than 100% in that time and that the arrest rate among that "Asian" population (which was already very low compared to the general population) had halved. A member of the general population was now four times more likely to be arrested than an "Asian".

Outraged reaction swiftly followed, and formal complaints to New Zealand Press Council came from the Asia New Zealand Foundation, the head of Journalism at Massey University and a consortium of mostly academics, journalists and ethnic Asian community leaders led by Tze Ming Mok.

The following month, the New Zealand Press Council condemned Coddington's article and ordered North & South to print an apology.

The Press Council found the language of the article "misleading" and "emotionally loaded". The Council stated that even though journalists are "entitled to take a strong position on issues they address ... that does not legitimise gratuitous emphasis on dehumanising racial stereotypes and fear-mongering and, of course, the need for accuracy always remains".

Coddington called the New Zealand Press Council's decision "pathetic".

Bibliography

 
 
 
  (with introduction by Lindsay Perigo)
 
 
 
  (Coddington and co-author Richard Prebble contributed: "Lessons of freedom and choice".)

References

External links
 Coddington now a lover, not a hater

Living people
ACT New Zealand MPs
New Zealand journalists
Women members of the New Zealand House of Representatives
New Zealand list MPs
Libertarianz politicians
Unsuccessful candidates in the 1996 New Zealand general election
Unsuccessful candidates in the 1999 New Zealand general election
People from Waipukurau
Members of the New Zealand House of Representatives
21st-century New Zealand politicians
21st-century New Zealand women politicians
Year of birth missing (living people)